Asca holosternalis is a species of mite in the family Ascidae.

References

Further reading

 

holosternalis
Articles created by Qbugbot
Animals described in 1994
Taxa named by Wolfgang Karg